Alatuncusiodes is a genus of moths of the family Crambidae. It contains only one species, Alatuncusiodes korytkowskii, which is found in Peru.

References

Dichogamini
Monotypic moth genera
Moths of South America
Taxa named by Eugene G. Munroe
Crambidae genera